Modesty or Chastity or Veiled Truth by Antonio Corradini is a sculpture completed in 1752 during the Rococo period. Corradini was commissioned by Raimondo di Sangro to sculpt a memorial for his mother in the Cappella Sansevero in Naples, where the marble sculpture remains today.

About the work 
Corradini worked mostly in Venice but also spent some time in Vienna and Naples before his death in 1752. Modesty was the last in Corradini's series of veiled female nudes, a subject he developed and refined throughout his career. His mastery of the medium of marble is seen in the increasingly skilled representation of seemingly weightless cloth over human flesh in his commissioned pieces. Modesty is positioned on a pedestal in the chapel and can sometimes be lost in the beauty of the space and its surrounding statues created by other various artists. Raimondo wanted this commemoration to depict his mother's untimely death when he was not even a year old.

An image of this statue is painted on the wall of a high building in Naples.

Visual features 

The figure is in a contrapposto stance, having her weight on one foot more than the other. This pose gives her human-like qualities and a motion as if she is in the middle of an action. The way her classical drapery falls on her body also shows this movement. The artists of eighteenth-century Italy were especially interested in the depiction of movement as Corradini was. Her face is turned away from the viewer, shielding her eyes with the transparent veil. Her stance is inviting; however, her face is telling a different story. The veil seems heavy but also see-through. It falls just so over her chest to accentuate her breasts, but also covers her pubic area so that it is not overtly sexual. She is exposed yet metaphorically shielded by the drapery. Her supple body is fluid almost as though she has no bones and is just a smooth and perfect human. These idealized qualities lead to a feeling that she is a divine woman and not of this world.

Sansevero Chapel 
Modesty is one of two sculptures Corradini completed for the Sansevero Chapel, both a part of a ten-statue series of the Virtues. The veiled female figure embodies modesty but can also be considered a representation of wisdom. There is a clear reference to the veiled statue of Isis at Sais in Egypt. It is said that there is a quote on the ancient statue that reads "I am past, present, and future…". This allegory furthers Modestys aspect of wisdom and the statue is often referred to as Veiled Truth. The symbols such as the cracked plaque illustrate her life being cut too short. On the pedestal that the statue stands there is a relief of a biblical scene of Christ appearing to Mary Magdalene as a gardener portraying the importance of the Christian faith to the family. Corradini's other work is Decorum, which is also in the series of virtues. Decorum is a depiction of a youthful male nude scantily clothed in lion skin. He was also commissioned to make the piece Veiled Christ for the chapel but it was completed by Giuseppe Sanmartino instead when Corradini died suddenly. His two statues line the wall of Sansevero along with eight others. Modesty is positioned in its original location giving viewers the ability to see the statue in its intended arrangement.

Patronage 
This series of virtues was commissioned by Raimondo di Sangro who was the seventh Prince of Sansevero. Patronage is imperative in the art world and is meant to convey the visions of the person paying for the artwork. Raimondo was known for his interest in science and the arts. Raimondo acquired the church in the mid eighteenth century and transformed it into what is seen today. He was very particular about his ideas for the mausoleum and hired what he thought were the best artists to work on it. The visual theme of the Rococo movement is seen in the adorned building with a painted ceiling, marble tombs and relief sculptures.

Veiled figures 

Corradini's interest in the veiled human form spanned his long career. His subjects were usually woman and often allegorical. Early in his career, his works depicted heavily draped figures in a classical manner and then progressed to a thin, translucent layer of marble acting as a veil as he perfected his craft. An example of the latter and the work on which Corradini based Modesty is his Vestal Virgin Tuccia, sculpted in Rome in 1743.

See also
 Pudicitia
 Veil of Isis
 Vestal Virgin Tuccia, 1743 sculpture
 Veiled Christ, 1753 sculpture
 Veiled Vestal 1847 sculpture
 The Veiled Virgin, mid-19th century sculpture
 The Veiled Nun, c. 1863 sculpture
 Veiled Rebecca, 1863 sculpture

Notes

References 
 Artstor. "Veiled woman." Accessed November 9, 2017

External links

 

Baroque sculptures
Marble sculptures in Italy
Cappella Sansevero
1752 sculptures
Veiled statues
Sculptures of women in Italy